Local elections were held in the Indian state of Tripura on 25 November 2021 to elect 222 of the 334 seats in one Municipal Corporation, 13 Municipal Councils and 6 Nagar Panchayats. The polls were hit with widespread violence and accusations of rigging. On polling day, the Supreme Court ordered the Ministry of Home Affairs to deploy two additional companies of Central paramilitary forces to ensure free and fair election in Tripura. A total of 785 candidates contested 222 seats and over 4.93 lakh electors were eligible to vote in this election.

Contesting parties

Results
Votes were counted on 28 November 2021, following which the results were announced by Tripura State Election Commission.

By political parties

By local bodies

References

2021 elections in India
Local elections in Tripura